Coming Home is the fourth studio album by New Zealand classical crossover band Sol3 Mio, released on 12 November 2021.

Production

The album featured a stripped-back production compared to the trio's previous albums. The album was recorded over four days during a gap in the group's touring schedule in 2021, and is a collection of live recordings performed at Roundhead Studios in Auckland. The songs the trio selected to cover for the album represent songs from their childhoods, to help their audience understand where their musical influences came from.

Release and promotion

The first single from the album was their cover of Prince Tui Teka's "E Ipo", which was released on 21 October. Sol3 Mio performed the Coming Home Tour in October 2022, performing four dates across New Zealand including Spark Arena in Auckland and the Michael Fowler Centre in Wellington.

Track listing

Charts

Weekly charts

Year-end charts

References

2021 albums
Universal Records albums
Sol3 Mio albums
Albums recorded at Roundhead Studios